Church Hill is a city in Hawkins County, Tennessee, United States. The population was 6,998 at the 2020 census and 6,737 at the 2010 census. It is part of the Kingsport–Bristol (TN)–Bristol (VA) Metropolitan Statistical Area, which is a component of the Johnson City–Kingsport–Bristol, TN-VA Combined Statistical Area – commonly known as the "Tri-Cities" region. It is the largest municipality located entirely within Hawkins County.

History
The community was established as a trading post and stagecoach stop called Spencer's Mill and Patterson Mill in the late 18th century. The name "Church Hill" came later, following the establishment of a Methodist church "on the hill" overlooking the Holston River valley. The church still stands today on Grandview Street. The city of Church Hill was incorporated in 1958.

One of Church Hill's most notable landmarks is the New Canton Plantation and its antebellum mansion, Canton Hall, owned by the Hord family. Other landmarks include Smith Place, built in the early 20th century, and the former site of Carter's Store, a 1770s-era trading outpost established by Tennessee pioneer John Carter.

Geography
Church Hill is located in eastern Hawkins County at  (36.520845, -82.725472). The city is situated among rolling hills on the northern portion of Smith Bend, overlooking the Holston River. The city is bordered by Mount Carmel to the northeast, and the Holston Army Ammunition Plant lies to the southeast, across the Holston River. Bays Mountain, a prominent Ridge-and-Valley formation, dominates the horizon to the south.

U.S. Route 11W connects Church Hill with Rogersville to the southwest and the Tri-Cities area to the northeast. State Route 346 intersects 11W near the center of the city.

Demographics

2020 census

As of the 2020 United States census, there were 6,998 people, 2,879 households, and 1,946 families residing in the city.

2000 census
As of the census of 2000, there were 5,916 people, 2,482 households, and 1,772 families residing in the city. The population density was 665.8 people per square mile (256.9/km2). There were 2,709 housing units at an average density of 304.9 per square mile (117.7/km2). The racial makeup of the city was 97.95% White, 1.30% African American, 0.12% Native American, 0.22% Asian, 0.07% from other races, and 0.34% from two or more races. Hispanic or Latino of any race were 0.41% of the population.

There were 2,482 households, out of which 29.2% had children under the age of 18 living with them, 59.5% were married couples living together, 9.9% had a female householder with no husband present, and 28.6% were non-families. 25.5% of all households were made up of individuals, and 9.1% had someone living alone who was 65 years of age or older. The average household size was 2.34 and the average family size was 2.78.

In the city, the population was spread out, with 21.4% under the age of 18, 6.5% from 18 to 24, 30.2% from 25 to 44, 26.9% from 45 to 64, and 15.0% who were 65 years of age or older. The median age was 39 years. For every 100 females, there were 89.4 males. For every 100 females age 18 and over, there were 85.7 males.

The median income for a household in the city was $36,563, and the median income for a family was $43,423. Males had a median income of $32,305 versus $25,010 for females. The per capita income for the city was $19,656. About 10.0% of families and 12.0% of the population were below the poverty line, including 16.2% of those under age 18 and 10.5% of those age 65 or over.

Education
Church Hill has one library, Church Hill Public Library, which is part of the Eastern Branch of the Hawkins County Library System. It was founded in 1952, and was moved into a new building in 2007. The library holds over 20,000 materials and serves over 6,000 patrons.

Education
Five schools are located within Church Hill's city limits: Carter's Valley Elementary, Church Hill Elementary, Church Hill Middle School, Church Hill Intermediate and Volunteer High School. All fall under the Hawkins County Schools system.

Parks and recreation
Church Hill has seven parks: Laurel Run Park, A.S. Derrick Park, Jaycees Park, J.W. Sally Park, S.L. Taylor Park, Bill Castle Park, and Church Hill Skate Park. The city also has one swimming pool, Church Hill Municipal Pool.

The City of Church Hill, City of Mount Carmel, and Town of Surgoinsville have joined together to form a joint Recreation Department. They offer indoor/outdoor soccer, baseball, football, and basketball.

Government

The city is governed by a mayor and six aldermen.

The city has a police department that also provides animal control services  and a fire department that handles public safety, hazmat and fire emergencies.

Infrastructure
Church Hill provides the community with trash pickup, snow and ice removal, mowing and park maintenance services. Residents of the city obtain power services from Holston Electric Cooperative or Appalachian Power. Water services are provided by a private utility, First Utility District of Hawkins County. Hawkins County Gas Utility provides natural gas services and internet and phone services are provided by Charter Communications or CenturyLink.

Notable people
 Lloyd Carr, former football head coach for the University of Michigan was born in Church Hill, and lived there as a child.
 Blake Leeper, 2012 U.S. Paralympian competing in track and field
 James Alan Shelton, bluegrass guitarist

See also
WMCH

References

External links

City of Church Hill official website
MTAS entry for Church Hill

Cities in Tennessee
Cities in Hawkins County, Tennessee
Kingsport–Bristol metropolitan area